David Michael Sayer (19 September 1936 – 23 January 2017) was an English professional cricketer. He played for Kent County Cricket Club between 1955 and 1976. 

He was one of the founding members of the Professional Cricketers' Association in 1967. He died on 23 January 2017, aged 80.

References

External links

1936 births
2017 deaths
English cricketers
Kent cricketers
People from Romford
Oxford University cricketers
Marylebone Cricket Club cricketers
Gentlemen cricketers
People educated at Maidstone Grammar School
Alumni of Brasenose College, Oxford
Cricketers from Greater London